Gnoma atomaria is a species of beetle in the family Cerambycidae. It was described by Guérin de Méneville in 1834. It is known from India.

References

Lamiini
Beetles described in 1834